The Rockport Cemetery is a historic cemetery off Business United States Route 270 in Rockport, Arkansas.  Just under  in size, it is the community's oldest and largest cemetery, with known burials dating to 1851.  It is the best surviving element of the community's early settlement period and was laid out in the then-fashionable rural cemetery style.  A  part of the cemetery, including its two oldest sections, was listed on the National Register of Historic Places in 2002.

See also
National Register of Historic Places listings in Hot Spring County, Arkansas

References

External links

 

Cemeteries on the National Register of Historic Places in Arkansas
Buildings and structures completed in 1851
1851 establishments in Arkansas
National Register of Historic Places in Hot Spring County, Arkansas
Cemeteries established in the 1850s